|}

The Lombardstown Mares Novice Chase is a Grade 3 National Hunt novice steeplechase in Ireland which is open to mares aged four years or older. It is run at Cork over a distance of about 2 miles and half a furlong (2 miles and 160 yards, or 3,365 metres). The race is scheduled to take place each year in December. Since 2014 the race has been sponsored by the Kerry Group and run as the Kerry Group European Breeders Fund Mares Novice Chase.

The race was first run in 2004, and was awarded Grade 3 status in 2009 and Grade 2 status in 2021.

Records
Leading jockey (3 wins):
 Paul Townend – Vroum Vroum Mag (2014), Listen Dear (2016), Camelia de Cotte (2018)

Leading trainer  (6 wins):
 Willie Mullins -  Pomme Tiepy (2007), Vroum Vroum Mag (2014), Listen Dear (2016), Camelia de Cotte (2018), Elimay (2019), Concertista (2021)

Winners

See also
 Horse racing in Ireland
 List of Irish National Hunt races

References
Racing Post:

National Hunt chases
National Hunt races in Ireland
Cork Racecourse
Recurring sporting events established in 2004
2004 establishments in Ireland